Kerala Congress (Skaria Thomas) is a political party in Kerala, India. It was formed after a split in Kerala Congress (Anti-merger Group). The party was led by late Skariah Thomas.

It is a part of Left Democratic Front (LDF).

Party Organisation
Binoy Joseph is the Chairman of the party

Other Notable leaders
Skaria Thomas

References

Kerala Congress Parties
Political parties established in 2015
2015 establishments in Kerala